The Kuybyshevskaya Railway (Ку́йбышевская желе́зная доро́га) is a subsidiary of the Russian Railways operating in Tatarstan, Bashkortostan, Mordovia, Ryazan Oblast, Penza, Tambov, Ulyanovsk, Samara, Orenburg, and Chelyabinsk Oblasts of Russia. Its headquarters are in Samara. The railway route length totals 11 502 km.

The oldest railway in the network is that linking Morshansk and Syzran; it was built between 1872 and 1875. In 1880, engineers Nikolai Belelubsky and Konstantin Mikhailovsky designed the Syzran Bridge across the Volga, then the longest in Europe. The railway reached Zlatoust in 1890 and Chelyabinsk two years later. The main office of the Samara–Zlatoust Railway was located in Ufa.

After the Russian Revolution, several lines of the Moscow–Kazan and Syzran–Vyazma routes were added to the Syzran–Zlatoust Railway. The network was renamed after Valerian Kuybyshev in 1936 (as was the city of Samara). In 1989, the railway was the site of the worst train disaster in the history of the Soviet Union resulting in 575 deaths (see Ufa train disaster).

External links 

 

Railway lines in Russia
Rail transport in Samara Oblast
Rail transport in Ulyanovsk Oblast
Rail transport in Tatarstan
1936 establishments in Russia
Recipients of the Order of Lenin
Railway lines opened in 1936